Team Birmingham Elite are an English basketball club, based in the Longbridge area of the city of Birmingham.

History
The club was founded in 2004, as the Aston Athletics, to play at the Aston Events Centre, which had just been vacated by British Basketball League side Birmingham Bullets. Starting out in English Basketball League Division 3 North, the Athletics enjoyed excellent rookie season which saw them lift the Men's National Shield and finish second in the league, but only on countback in games against winners Plymouth Raiders II. They also reached the semi-finals of the EBL3 Play-offs.

The team relocated, from Aston Events Centre to Birmingham Sports Centre in 2006, and, following the dissolution of the Bullets, the club changed its name to Birmingham Athletics to reflect its status as the only National League team representing the city at the time. They subsequently stated their desire to turn professional by becoming the second EBL team (after Coventry Crusaders) to apply for membership of the proposed British Basketball Association (BBA), a league devised to compete with the incumbent British Basketball League as the premier basketball competition in the country, in its inaugural season in 2007–08. However, the BBA never materialized; and this, combined with the BBL and members of the defunct Birmingham Bullets team creating a new Birmingham franchise, the Birmingham Panthers, ultimately prevented Athletics from realizing their professional ambitions.

Elite are now primarily a development-focused club; with teams from under 14s to senior, the first team had been based around under-19 players from Elite Academies Basketball League side Bournville College. As of 2019, the academy is now based at James Watt College in the city.  The development pathway is completed with a link between the club and Birmingham City University, who compete in the British Universities and Colleges Sport League. The first team and academy is currently coached by Birmingham born, former Euroleague player Steven Hansell.

Teams
As of the 2019-20 season, Elite field teams in the following National League divisions: 

 Senior Men
 Senior Women

 U18 Men
 U18 Women

 U16 Boys
 U14 Boys

Honours
U18 Men's National Cup: (1) 2013-14

Notable former players

Home Venue
Elite are based at The Factory Young People's Centre in the Longbridge area of the city.

Men's season-by-season records

References

Basketball teams in England
Sport in Birmingham, West Midlands